Xinhuang Dong Autonomous County (usually referred to as "Xinhuang County", commonly abbreviated as Xinhuang) is an autonomous county of Dong people and the westernmost county of Hunan Province, China, it is under the administration of the prefecture-level city of Huaihua.

On the map, Xinhuang County looks like the insertion of a wedge on the eastern margin of Guizhou Province. It is the westernmost county of the province, the county is surrounded by Guizhou to the north, west and south. it is bordered to the north by Wanshan District of Tongren, to the west by Yuping, Zhenyuan and Sansui Counties, to the north by Tianzhu County, to the east by Zhijiang County. The county has nine towns and two townships under its jurisdiction, the county seat is the town of Huangzhou.

History
Human habitation in Xinhuang Dong Autonomous County dates back to ancient times. More than 10 Paleolithic and Neolithic human sites have been found in the county.

During the Xia, Shang and Zhou dynasties (2070 BC–256 BC), it belonged to Jingzhou.

During the Spring and Autumn period and Warring States period (770 BC–221 BC), it was under the jurisdiction of Chu State (1115 BC–223 BC).

After conquering all the states, Emperor Qin Shi Huang implemented the system of prefectures and counties in 221 BC. Xinhuang Dong Autonomous County belonged to Qianzhongjun.

In the Western Han dynasty (206 BC–8 AD), Xinhuang Dong Autonomous County was under the jurisdiction of Wuyang County of Wulingjun. In the Eastern Han dynasty (25–220), it was under the jurisdiction of Chenyang County of Wulingjun.

In the Three Kingdoms period (220–280), king of Wu State (222–280), Sun Quan, seized Jingzhou, Xinhuang Dong Autonomous County came under the jurisdiction of Wuyang County of Wulingjun.

In the Southern dynasties (420–589), it belonged to the territory of the Liang State and came under the jurisdiction of Longbiao County of Nanyangjun.

In 581, Emperor Wen of Sui established the Sui Empire, it was under the jurisdiction of Longbiao County of Yuanlingjun.

In 634, in the 8th year of Zhenguan period of the Tang dynasty (618–907), Yelang County was set up. In 691, Weixi County was established. In 704, Yelang County united with Weixi County to form Wuzhou. It was renamed Hezhou in 725 and then Yezhou in 735. In the late Tang dynasty, Tian Hanquan, controlled the region and changed its name to "Huangzhou".

In 991, the Tian family submitted to the Song Empire. In 1074, Zhang Dun captured the region and founded Yuanzhou. It was under the jurisdiction of Luyang County. In 1108, it restored the original name "Yelang County".

In 1276, the government of the Yuan Empire established Yuanzhoulu. It was under the jurisdiction of Luyang County.

In the Ming dynasty (1368–1644), it belonged to Yuanzhou.

In 1736, in the reign of Qianlong Emperor of the Qing dynasty (1644–1911), Yuanzhou was upgraded to an fu. The Zhijiang County was set up here.

In 1913, Huang County was founded.

On November 7, 1949, Huang County was liberated by the People's Liberation Army. On November 10, the People's Government of Huang County was organized. Xiao Lin served as its first county magistrate. It was under the jurisdiction of Huitong Zhuanqu. In August 1952, it belonged to Zhijiang Zhuanqu. In December of that same year, Zhijiang Zhuanqu was renamed "Qianyang Zhuanqu". On December 5, 1956, the Xinhuang Dong Autonomous County was set up with the approval of the State Council.

Administrative division
As of October 2015, Xinhuang Dong Autonomous County has two ethnic townships and nine towns under its jurisdiction. The county seat is the town of Huangzhou.

Geography
Xinhuang Dong Autonomous County is located in the western Hunan province. It lies in the middle reaches of the Wushui River. It is surrounded by Wanshan District of Tongren City on the north, Zhenyuan County, Sansui County and Yuping Dong Autonomous County on the west, Zhijiang Dong Autonomous County on the east, and Tianzhu County on the south.

Climate

Rivers
There are 268 rivers and streams in the county. Wushui River is the largest river in the county and it has two major tributaries, Ping Stream and West Stream. The Zhonghe River flows through the southeastern county. The Dragon Stream flows through the downtown county.

Lakes and reservoirs
The Zhaoyang Reservoir is the largest reservoir in the county. Other reservoirs include Banxi Reservoir and Guzhao Reservoir.

Mountains

Demographics

As of 2017, the National Bureau of Statistics of China estimates the county's population now to be 259,016, of which 41,538 were non-agricultural, 217,478 were agricultural, 3,086 were born in the year, the birth rate was 11.9‰, 4,449 people died in the year, the mortality rate was 17.15‰.

Ethnicity 
According to the 2013 Census, the ethnic makeup of Xinhuang Dong Autonomous County included: 216,800 Dong people (80.13%), 35,600 Han people (13.15%), and 17,300 Miao people (6.36%).

Language
Mandarin is the official language. The local people speak Kam language, Hmongic languages, and Dungan language.

Religion
The Dong and Miao people believe in animism and worship ancestors. Buddhism is the earliest foreign religion introduced in the county. Christianity was introduced into the region during the Republic of China (1912–1949), and churches were built in the towns of Zhongzhai and Liangsan. During the reign of Kangxi Emperor (1662–1722) of the Qing dynasty (1644–1911), Islam spread as Hui people moved into the area. Mosques were found in Xijiaodong Village and Caijia Village.

Economy
As of 2017, encompassing CN￥5.57 billion, the county was placed No. 81 in Hunan province.

The economy of Xinhuang Dong Autonomous County is driven by agriculture, forestry, animal husbandry, fishery industry, manufacturing industry, construction industry, and tourism. Other significant industries include finance, telecommunications, healthcare, and transportation. The county's agricultural products are mainly beef, tobacco and camphor, which known as the "three treasures of Yelang". Xinhuang Dong Autonomous County's manufacturing products include paper, food processing, cement production, and battery production. The service sector of the county's economy includes things like banking, health care, education, tourism and government.

Natural resources
Xinhuang Dong Autonomous County is rich in mineral resources, including mercury, iron, copper, lead, zinc, vanadium, nickel, gold, silver, potassium, limestone, barite and orthoclase. The barite reserves in the county reach 280 million tons, and the orthoclase reserves reach 900 million tons, which known as the "capital of barite in China" and the "capital of orthoclase in China".

Education
By the end of 2017, Xinhuang Dong Autonomous County had one county vocational secondary school, two high schools, 11 middle schools, 18 primary schools and 22 kindergartens.

Transportation

Highway
The G60 Shanghai–Kunming Expressway, more commonly known as "Hukun Expressway", is an east–west highway passing through the county's downtown, commercial, and industrial districts in the northern part of the county.

The G320 National Highway is an east–west highway passing through commercial and residential districts north of the county limits.

The Provincial Highway S232 passes through the center county leading southwards to the towns of Hetan, Fuluo, and Gongxi.

Rail
The Shanghai–Kunming high-speed railway is a high-speed railway passes across the towns of Bozhou, Huangzhou, Yushi, and Linchong. Xinhuang railway station is an intermediate stop on the Shanghai–Kunming railway.

Tourism
The famous natural landscapes of Xinhuang Dong Autonomous County are: Yelang Valley, Huangjialong Forest Park, Tianlei Mountain, Liangsan Hot Spring, Xianrenqiao, Xuanjing Mountain and Longtang Lake. Major human landscape in Xinhuang Dong Autonomous County include Stone Pavilion, Huangzhou Wind-rain Bridge, Three-arch Bridge, Zhenjiang Pavilion, and Longxi Ancient City. Major Buddhist temples in the county include Songlin Temple, Yanlai Temple, and Feishan Temple. Major Taoist temples in the county include Palace of the Kitchen God, Longevity Palace, and Pavilion of Jade Emperor.

Notable people
Wu Qiang (born 1966), Chinese politician currently serving as party secretary of Bijie

References

Bibliography

External links 
www.xzqh.org 

 
County-level divisions of Hunan
Geography of Huaihua
Kam autonomous counties